Mike Darow (born Darow Myhowich; January 8, 1933 – December 7, 1996) was a Canadian-born television game show host. Darow is best known for hosting the 1968–1970 ABC run of Dream House in the United States, the 1985–1988 Canada-produced run of the Bob Stewart game show, Jackpot (seen in the U.S. on the USA Network), and Club 6 from 1960 to 1962.

He also hosted the first season of the game show The $128,000 Question, a syndicated revival of The $64,000 Question, in 1976. Darow's announcing work included the NBC game show The Who, What, or Where Game (1969–1974) and sub-announcing duties in 1980 for the Wink Martindale version of Tic Tac Dough. He also hosted the game show Bluff in 1976 and A Go Go '66 in 1966. He also hosted the Canadian game show Going Places from 1973 to 1980.

Darow also worked as an on-air disc jockey in the early 1960s in Toronto at radio station CHUM. While there, he sang on two novelty recordings made as promotions for the station. Along with other on-air personalities at CHUM, they recorded songs as The Chumingbird (play on words). One song as a solo artist was The Battle of Queenston Heights in 1959. He later hosted Toronto-based segments of the MDA Labor Day Telethon, (photo of telethon) as well as emceeing the annual ACT Telerama for CFRN in Edmonton.

Darow died on December 7, 1996, aged 63. He was laid to rest in Mount Pleasant Cemetery in Toronto, Ontario, Canada.

References

External links
 Mike Darow profile at The CHUM Tribute site
 

1933 births
1996 deaths
Canadian game show hosts
Canadian radio personalities
Canadian emigrants to the United States